Phellodon radicatus is a species of tooth fungus in the family Bankeraceae. It was described as new to science in 1985 from collections made in Gainesville, Florida.

References

External links

Fungi described in 1985
Fungi of the United States
Inedible fungi
radicatus
Fungi without expected TNC conservation status